The New Democratic Party of Ontario ran a full slate of candidates in the 1981 provincial election and won 21 seats out of 125 to become the third-largest party in the legislature.  Many of the party's candidates have their own biography pages; information about others may be found here.

Candidates

Peterborough: Paul Rexe
J. Paul Rexe (June 5, 1944 – August 9, 2010) was a prominent municipal politician in Peterborough. He served for several years on the Peterborough city council and made unsuccessful bids for the House of Commons of Canada, the Legislative Assembly of Ontario, and the mayoralty of Peterborough.

Born in Kingston, Rexe was raised and educated in Peterborough. He articled in chartered accountancy in the early 1960s and later worked in computer programming with General Electric. He received a Bachelor of Arts degree in History and Economics from Trent University in 1968, as well as earning a Bachelor of Science degree in Anthropology in 1970. He also received a teaching diploma from the University of Toronto and worked as a secondary school teacher in Peterborough from 1968 to 1999. In 1994, he received a Master of Arts degree in Canadian studies from Trent. After retiring, he worked as an adjunct professor at Queen's University. He also wrote a weekly column in the Peterborough Examiner from 1998 to 2003.

Rexe served on council from 1972 to 1974, from 1980 to 1987, and from 2003 to 2006. In 1987, he was ejected from council by judicial order for not properly declaring a conflict of interest related to his position as a consultant on a real-estate deal. As a result of the charge, he was prohibited from holding office for two years. He appealed the decision, which was upheld by a three-member panel from the Supreme Court of Ontario.

He was a New Democratic Party candidate in the 1980 federal election and the 1981 provincial election. In later life, he worked as a researcher and consultant for Conservative Member of Parliament Dean Del Mastro. He was defeated in his bid for mayor in 2006.

Rexe was frequently described as a larger-than-life and confrontational personality. He had several clashes with Peterborough mayor Sylvia Sutherland, whom he described as the "Duchess of Debt." During his last term on council, his reputation was compromised by a public incident with a female friend that resulted in an assault charge (which was later dropped). He also had a long-running battle with Revenue Canada. In the 2006 mayoral election, he took the unusual step of creating a web page called "The Straight Facts About Paul Rexe" to address these issues. The controversies notwithstanding, Rexe was rated by the journal Peterborough This Week as council's best member in 2005.

Rexe died of colon cancer in August 2010, following an eighteen-month battle.

St. Catharines: Don F. Loucks

Loucks had a letter published in The Globe and Mail newspaper on June 13, 1980, advocating compulsory checkoffs to strengthen the power of trade unions.  He received 4,927 votes (15.47%) in the 1981 election, finishing third against Liberal incumbent Jim Bradley.

References

1981